Pieter Johannes "Jan" Brussaard (30 January 1875 – 28 December 1940) was a Dutch sport shooter who competed in the 1908 Summer Olympics and in the 1920 Summer Olympics.

He was born in Delfshaven and died in Rotterdam. He was the father of Jan Hendrik Brussaard. In 1908 he finished seventh with the Dutch team in the team free rifle event. Four years later at the 1920 Summer Olympics he participated in the following events:

 Team free rifle - eighth place
 Team 600 metre military rifle, prone - ninth place
 Team 300 metre military rifle, standing - tenth place
 Team 300 metre military rifle, prone - twelfth place
 Team 300 and 600 metre military rifle, prone - 13th place
 300 metre free rifle, three positions - place unknown

References

External links
list of Dutch shooters

1875 births
1940 deaths
Dutch male sport shooters
ISSF rifle shooters
Olympic shooters of the Netherlands
Shooters at the 1908 Summer Olympics
Shooters at the 1920 Summer Olympics
Sportspeople from Rotterdam